Four Way Books is an American nonprofit literary press located in New York City, New York, which publishes poetry and short fiction by emerging and established writers. It features the work of the winners of national poetry competitions, as well as collections accepted through general submission, panel selection, and solicitation by the editors. The press is run by director and founding editor Martha Rhodes, who is the author of five poetry collections. Four Way Books titles are distributed by University of Chicago Press. The press has received grants from
New York State Council on the Arts, the National Endowment for the Arts, and The Council of Literary Magazines and Presses through their re-grant program.

Authors 
Representative authors published by Four Way Books include Catherine Bowman, Reginald Dwayne Betts, Kevin Prufer, Terri Ford, Forrest Hamer, Pimone Triplett, Yona Harvey, Jeffrey Harrison, Sarah Gorham, D. Nurkse, Gregory Pardlo, Laurel Blossom, C. Dale Young, Noelle Kocot, Joel Brouwer, Cynthia Cruz, Pablo Medina, Jay Baron Nicorvo, Maya Pindyck, Cynthia Huntington, Jason Schneiderman, and Sarah Manguso.

Authors have been recipients of the Pulitzer Prize for Poetry, the Kingsley Tufts Poetry Award, the Rome Prize, The Edward Lewis Wallant Award, Guggenheim Fellowships, NEA fellowships, and many other honors; and Tommye Blount’s Fantasia for the Man in Blue was a finalist for the 2020 National Book Award Four Way Books authors have been interviewed on the PBS NewsHour, regional
 and national radio, and print media, including The New York Times.

Recognition 
Four Way Books titles have been reviewed in The New Yorker, Publishers Weekly, Library Journal, Kirkus Reviews,<ref>[https://www.kirkusreviews.com/book-reviews/eileen-pollack/in-the-mouth/ Kirkus Reviews | Book Reviews | In the Mouth by Eileen Pollack | March 1, 2008]</ref> Booklist, and many other publications. The press has been profiled in The New York Times Arts Beat,  and in Poets & Writers. In a twenty-fifth anniversary feature of the press, the Los Angeles Review of Books'' praised Four Way Books for “publishing some of the most interesting, aesthetically diverse collections of poetry and fiction in the country.”

The press sponsors the annual Levis Prize in Poetry for a full-length poetry collection; and through their Four Way Books + Friends Program, has sponsored since 1993, joint readings by its authors with those of other presses, and authors yet to be published. The press also sponsors “Pay a Book Forward, which offers free books to college students who attend readings,” and “the electronic journal Four Way Review, which publishes poetry and fiction from emerging and established authors.”

References

Sources 
Four Way Books Website, Various Pages

External links 
 Four Way Books Website
 University Press of New England > Four Way Books Titles
 Council of Literary Magazines and Small Presses > Directory of Member Publishers
 Downtown Express > Downtown Poets Society:Bards Band together, by Ronda Kaysen > Volume 18, No. 3 > 06/16/05

Book publishing companies based in New York (state)
Publishing companies based in New York City
Non-profit organizations based in New York City
Culture of New York City